Kazachinsko-Lensky District is an administrative district, one of the thirty-three in Irkutsk Oblast, Russia. Municipally, it is incorporated as Kazachinsko-Lensky Municipal District. It is located in the eastern-central portion of the oblast. Its administrative center is the rural locality (a selo) of Kazachinskoye. As of the 2010 Census, the total population of the district was 18,829, with the population of Kazachinskoye accounting for 13.9% of that number.

History
Kazachinsky District was established within Kirensk Okrug of Irkutsk Oblast on June 26, 1926. It was given its present name on December 3, 1930.

Geography
The Baikal Range and the Akitkan Range (Хребет Акиткан) rise in the district. The Kirenga River is the main water body of the Kazachinsky District.

References

Notes

Sources

Districts of Irkutsk Oblast
States and territories established in 1926
